James Treacy (born 1943) is an Irish retired hurler who played as a left corner-back for the Kilkenny senior team.

Born in Bennettsbridge, County Kilkenny, Treacy first arrived on the inter-county scene at the age of twenty when he first linked up with the Kilkenny senior team. He joined the team during the 1963 championship. Treacy went on to play a key role over the next decade, winning four All-Ireland medals, eight Leinster medals and one National Hurling League medal. He captained the team to the All-Ireland title in 1967.

At club level Treacy is a five-time championship medallist with Bennettsbridge.

His brother, Martin Treacy, also enjoyed All-Ireland success with Kilkenny.

Throughout his career Treacy made 30 championship appearances. He retired from inter-county following the conclusion of the 1975 championship.

Playing career

Club

Treacy played hurling with his local club in Bennettsbridge and enjoyed much success during a golden age for the club.

In 1964 Bennettsbridge qualified for the final of the county senior championship with Treacy lining out in defence.  Glenmore provided the opposition, however, they proved no match for 'the bridge'. A 4–9 to 1–4 victory gave Treacy his first county championship title.

Treacy's side surrendered their championship crown to Mooncoin the following year, however, both sides met in the county final again in 1966.  Bennettsbridge had the upper-hand for the game and won by 4–8 to 2–4.  It was Treacy's second county title.

Bennettsbridge continued their dominance of the club championship again in 1967.  Thomastown stood in the way of a second successive championship title, however, Bennettsbridge powered to a 3–10 to 1–4 win and a third championship title for Treacy in four years.

Treacy's side had the chance to make it three-in-a-row in 1968.  After reaching the championship decider an Eddie Keher-inspired Rower-Inistioge side provided the opposition.  A close game developed, however, Treacy's side were defeated by 3–9 to 3–7.

After a number of years out of the limelight, Bennettsbridge returned to the championship decider again in 1971.  The Fenians club from Johnstown were the opponents, however, 'the bridge' secured the title by 3–10 to 1–7.  It was Treacy's fourth and final championship winners' medal.

Both sides did battle in the county finals of 1972 and 1974, however, Bennettsbridge were now in decline and lost both games to the dominant side of the seventies.

Inter-county

Treacy first came to prominence on the inter-county scene as a member of the Kilkenny senior hurling team in the early 1960s.  He was a non-playing substitute when 'the Cats' won both the Leinster and All-Ireland titles in 1963.

In 1964 Treacy became a full member of the Kilkenny team at corner-back.  That year he won his first Leinster title on the field of play following a huge win over Dublin. Staunch local rivals Tipperary later provided the opposition in the All-Ireland final, however, Kilkenny were the pundits' favourites to retain the title. Jimmy Doyle had other ideas, however, as he scored ten points and set up Seán McLoughlin for a goal.  Tipperary's fourteen-point winning margin, 5–13 to 2–8, was the biggest All-Ireland final win since Tipperary had overwhelmed Laois in the 1949 decider.

Kilkenny lost their provincial crown in 1965, however, Kilkenny bounced back in 1966 with Treacy collecting his first National Hurling League medal and a second Leinster title.  This victory allowed Kilkenny to advance directly to the All-Ireland final where arch-rivals Cork provided the opposition.  It was the first meeting of these two great sides since 1947 and 'the Cats' were installed as the firm favourites.  In spite of this two goals by Colm Sheehan and a third from John O'Halloran gave Cork a merited 3–9 to 1–10 victory over an Eddie Keher-inspired Kilkenny.

In 1967 Treacy was appointed captain of the Kilkenny team.  It was another successful year as the team continued their provincial dominance with Treacy picking up a third Leinster title before lining out in a third All-Ireland final at Croke Park.  Tipperary were Kilkenny's opponents on the day, however, by this stage Tipp's pool of players was ageing and the county's hurling fortunes were in decline.  Kilkenny proved more than a match for the Munster champions.  Goals from Paddy Moran, Martin Brennan and Tom Walsh at vital times laid to rest a bogey that Tipperary had over Kilkenny since 1922. Treacy had finally captured his first All-Ireland winners' medal on the field of play, while he also had the honour of collecting the Liam MacCarthy Cup.

Wexford put an end to Kilkenny's hopes of retaining the title in 1968, however, the Noresiders bounced back the following year with Treacy collecting a fourth Leinster medal.  Cork faced Kilkenny in the subsequent All-Ireland final and revenge for 1966 was foremost in the minds of the Kilkenny team.  For a while it looked as if the Leesiders would triumph over their great rivals once again, however, five points from Kilkenny in the last seven minutes gave Treacy a second All-Ireland title.

1971 saw Treacy capture a fifth provincial medal as Kilkenny began to assert their dominance over Wexford.  The Leinster champions later played Tipperary in the only eighty-minute final between these great rivals.  The game has gone down in All-Ireland final folklore for a number of reasons.  As the first All-Ireland final to be broadcast by Telefís Éireann in colour, the nation saw Eddie Keher score a remarkable 2–11 and still end up on the losing side.  Kilkenny's ever-dependable goalkeeper, Ollie Walsh, had a nightmare of a game in which he conceded five goals, one of which passed through his legs, while that year's Hurler of the Year, Michael 'Babs' Keating, played out the closing stages of the game in his bare feet.  After a thrilling game Tipp emerged the victors on a score line of 5–17 to 5–14.  Treacy finished off the year by being named on the inaugural All-Star team.

In 1972 Keher won a sixth Leinster title following a victory over Wexford in a replay of the provincial final. Once again, Cork provided the opposition in the All-Ireland final, a game which is often considered to be one of the classic games of the modern era.  Halfway through the second-half Cork were on form and stretched their lead to eight points.  In a remarkable turnaround Kilkenny drew level and outscored Cork by another eight points.  A 3–24 to 5–11 score line gave Kilkenny the win and gave Treacy a third ALl-Ireland winners' medal.  He later collected a second All-Star award.

The Leinster championship posed little difficulty for Kilkenny again in 1973 and Treacy collected a sixth provincial medal as Wexford were defeated once again.  He missed the subsequent All-Ireland final through injury, however, Limerick won the game by 1–21 to 1–14.

Wexford were once again narrowly defeated by Kilkenny in the 1974 Leinster final, giving Treacy an eighth provincial title.  In a repeat of the previous year Limerick provided the opposition in the All-Ireland final, however, revenge was foremost in the minds of Kilkenny supporters.  The Munster champions stormed to a five-point lead in the first eleven minutes, however, a converted penalty by Eddie Keher, supplemented by two further Kilkenny goals gave 'the Cats' a twelve-point win and gave Treacy a fourth All-Ireland winners' medal.

When the championship campaign started in 1975 Treacy was approaching the end of his playing career.  He was dropped from the starting fifteen, however, he collected another set of Leinster and All-Ireland medals as a non-playing substitute.  Treacy retired from inter-county hurling following these wins.

References

Teams

1943 births
Living people
Bennettsbridge hurlers
Kilkenny inter-county hurlers
Leinster inter-provincial hurlers
All-Ireland Senior Hurling Championship winners